Los Barrios de Bureba is a municipality located in the province of Burgos, Castile and León, Spain. According to the 2004 census ([[Instituto Nacional de Estadística 
(Spain)|INE]]), the municipality has a population of 243 inhabitants.

References

External links
 http://www.losbarrios.esguay.com/

Municipalities in the Province of Burgos